Nangal Wildlife Sanctuary is located in the foothills of Shiwalik in the state of Punjab. It serves as a home to various varieties of both flora and fauna. Aside from supporting varieties of flora and fauna, Nangal Wildlife Sanctuary also `houses’ some of the threatened species, such as the endangered Indian Pangolin, Egyptian Vulture, and many more.

Location 
Situated in the city of Nangal, Punjab, Nangal Wildlife Sanctuary, covers an area of 116 hectares, most of it water. The Nangal Wetland is situated on the banks of Sutlej River and is among a favorite destinations for tourists. The Nangal Dam is also a part of the sanctuary which allows in the flow of a natural ecosystem across the area.

References 

Wildlife sanctuaries in Punjab, India
Ramsar sites in India